Mullaghduff (Irish: An Mullach Dubh) is a townland in northwest County Donegal, Ireland. It forms part of the greater Rosses region and is officially in the Gaeltacht, however, English is the predominantly spoken language today.

Etymology
The name Mullaghduff is an anglicisation of the Irish placename ‘An Mullach Dubh’, which means 'The Black Hilltop'; which possibly derives from the blackish soil which covers the nearby hills.

Music and sport
Mullaghduff is home to the marching band Buíonn Cheoil Mhullach Dubh, founded in 1881, which includes the "Old Band" and the "Wee Band". They have won the All Ireland Fleadh - Marching Band Competition fourteen times.

Mullaghduff is also home to Glasgow Celtic's first sod of turf, which was cut in April 1995 and placed in Celtic Park. In June 1995, a small plaque which is along the road was unveiled by Celtic Captain Paul McStay.

Religion
The predominant religion in Mullaghduff is Roman Catholicism and it is part of the parish of Kincasslagh. The nearest churches that serve parishioners are St. Mary's Church in Kincasslagh and St. Mary's Star of the Sea in Annagry.

See also
 List of towns and villages in Ireland

References

Gaeltacht places in County Donegal
Gaeltacht towns and villages
The Rosses
Towns and villages in County Donegal
Townlands of County Donegal